Dave Burt (born 1937) is a former Australian rules footballer who played with Collingwood in the Victorian Football League (VFL).

Notes

External links 

1937 births
Australian rules footballers from Victoria (Australia)
Collingwood Football Club players
Ivanhoe Amateurs Football Club players
Living people